Japonolaeops dentatus is a species of lefteye flounder found in the western Pacific Ocean from southern Japan to Taiwan. This species grows to a length of  SL. This species is important commercially. This species is the only known member of its genus.

References
 

Bothidae
Fish described in 1969